Marie Therese Tehan (19 June 1940 – 31 October 2004) was an Australian politician and lawyer.

Educated at Sacré Cœur School, Glen Iris, Melbourne and at the University of Melbourne, Marie O'Brien qualified as a lawyer. She married James "Jim" Tehan in 1963 and settled in regional Victoria. They had six children—including Dan Tehan, the current federal member for Wannon, elected in the 2010 federal election. She established her own legal practice in Mansfield in 1970.

Tehan was elected to the Victorian Parliament in 1987 and retired in 1999. Representing the Liberal Party, Tehan served in both houses of the Victorian Parliament. She was the member for Central Highlands Province in the Legislative Council from 1987 to 1992 and for Seymour in the Legislative Assembly from 1992 to 1999. As a minister in the Kennett Liberal government, she held the portfolios of Minister for Health from 1992 to 1996 and Minister for Conservation and Land Management from 1996 to 1999.

Tehan died on 31 October 2004, at Nagambie, Victoria, aged 64, due to Creutzfeldt-Jakob disease (CJD).

References

 

1940 births
2004 deaths
20th-century Australian politicians
20th-century Australian women politicians
20th-century Australian lawyers
Australian people of Irish descent
Australian Roman Catholics
Australian women lawyers
Liberal Party of Australia members of the Parliament of Victoria
Melbourne Law School alumni
Women members of the Victorian Legislative Assembly
Women members of the Victorian Legislative Council
Deaths from Creutzfeldt–Jakob disease
Neurological disease deaths in Victoria (Australia)
20th-century women lawyers
Politicians from Melbourne
Lawyers from Melbourne
Victorian Ministers for the Environment
Members of the Victorian Legislative Council
Members of the Victorian Legislative Assembly